Malasiqui, officially the Municipality of Malasiqui, is a 1st class municipality in the province of Pangasinan, Philippines. According to the 2020 census, it has a population of 143,094 people.

It is mainly an agricultural municipality with rice, corn and tropical lowland vegetables as main crops. It is also famous for its mango fruits having one of the largest concentration of mango tree population in the Philippines.

Etymology
The word Malasiqui originates from the Pangasinan root word lasi meaning lightning.  With prefix ma indicating high degree and suffix qui indicating place - Malasiqui means "place full of lightning". Another version was that of three Spanish priests while conducting ocular during those days, were so pissed off with the condition of the road which was muddy. The first priest said "mala" which means bad. The second priest responded "si" which means yes. The third one apparently not paying attention asked "que?"  or "what". The local folk who overheard the conversation mistook it as if they are naming the town. And so it came to be known as Mala-Si-Que or the current name spelled as Malasiqui.

History
The Municipality traces its origins during the middle of the 17th century when Spanish friars opened a mission intended to convert the native population to Catholicism. The most probable founding year was 1671 when Spanish civil authorities in Manila gave the license for the creation of the town. There were no organized communities in the area before the Spaniards arrived. Attempts to group families into a settlement may have started as early as 1665. The present site was then heavily forested with small family groups scattered along banks of small rivers and creeks. The socio-political history of the municipality parallels that of the Pangasinan province and the country in general. Its history is punctuated by periods of foreign domination first by the Spanish, then by the United States and briefly by the Japanese during the 2nd World War. The population participated heavily in some of the bloodiest rebellions during the Spanish period. Catholicism and other Christian sects dominate the religious life of the people.  Ethnically, it is one of the few places in the province of Pangasinan which did not experience in-migration from other regions of the country. Consequently, Pangasinanse is the dominant ethnic group with almost no other ethnic groups mixing into the locality.

The poblacion or town center, is recently experiencing high commercial growth spurred mainly by high consumer spending generated by increase in family incomes attributable to earnings of OFWs (Overseas Filipino Workers). The estimate of OFW population as a percentage of adult labor force is as much as 22% - one of the highest rates in the Philippines. The OFW phenomenon is so significant that almost all households have at least one member working outside of the country.

Geography

Barangays 
Malasiqui is politically subdivided into 73 barangays. These barangays are headed by elected officials: Barangay Captain, Barangay Council, whose members are called Barangay Councilors. All are elected every three years.

 Abonagan
 Agdao
 Alacan
 Aliaga
 Amacalan
 Anolid
 Apaya
 Asin Este
 Asin Weste
 Bacundao Este
 Bacundao Weste
 Bakitiw
 Balite
 Banawang
 Barang
 Bawer
 Binalay
 Bobon
 Bolaoit
 Bongar
 Butao
 Cabatling
 Cabueldatan
 Calbueg
 Canan Norte
 Canan Sur
 Cawayan Bogtong
 Don Pedro
 Gatang
 Goliman
 Gomez
 Guilig
 Ican
 Ingalagala
 Lareg-lareg
 Lasip
 Lepa
 Loqueb Este
 Loqueb Norte
 Loqueb Sur
 Lunec
 Mabulitec
 Malimpec
 Manggan-Dampay
 Nancapian
 Nalsian Norte
 Nalsian Sur
 Nansangaan
 Olea
 Pacuan
 Palapar Norte
 Palapar Sur
 Palong
 Pamaranum
 Pasima
 Payar
 Poblacion
 Polong Norte
 Polong Sur
 Potiocan
 San Julian
 Tabo-Sili
 Tobor
 Talospatang
 Taloy
 Taloyan
 Tambac
 Tolonguat
 Tomling
 Umando
 Viado
 Waig
 Warey

Climate

Demographics

Economy

Government
Malasiqui, belonging to the third congressional district of the province of Pangasinan, is governed by a mayor designated as its local chief executive and by a municipal council as its legislative body in accordance with the Local Government Code. The mayor, vice mayor, and the councilors are elected directly by the people through an election which is being held every three years.

Elected officials

Tourism

The Town Fiesta is celebrated January 17 thru 22 every year. Points of interests include:

Malasiqui Agno Valley College
Perpetual Help College of Pangasinan
Harvest Festival
Assembly of God
Rep. Rachel "Baby" Arenas farm
Monastery of the Poor Clares of St. James the Apostle
Archdiocese of Lingayen-Dagupan's first cloistered monastery
Malasiqui Central School 
Centeno Farm Resort and Ecohills Resort
Barangay Lareg-Lareg and the Arenas Civic Center
Magic Mall
St. Ildephonse of Seville Parish Church (Malasiqui)

Gallery

Notes

External links
 
 Malasiqui Profile at PhilAtlas.com
 Municipal Profile at the National Competitiveness Council of the Philippines
 Malasiqui at the Pangasinan Government Website
 Local Governance Performance Management System
 [ Philippine Standard Geographic Code]
 Philippine Census Information

Municipalities of Pangasinan